Terrimonas suqianensis is a Gram-negative, non-spore-forming and rod-shaped bacterium from the genus of Terrimonas which has been isolated from soil which was contaminated with tetrabromobisphenol A.

References

Chitinophagia
Bacteria described in 2017